Steve Garvey vs. Jose Canseco in Grand Slam Baseball is a 1987 video game published by Cosmi Corporation.

Gameplay
Steve Garvey vs. Jose Canseco in Grand Slam Baseball is a game in which the visiting and home team lineup include all star major league players.

Reception
David M. Wilson and Johnny L. Wilson reviewed the game for Computer Gaming World, and stated that "The graphics make excellent use of color, but the characters and animation is more reminiscent of older cartridge games than any recent releases."

References

External links
Review in RUN Magazine
Review in Compute!'s Gazette

1987 video games
Baseball video games
Commodore 64 games
Commodore 64-only games
Cosmi Corporation games
Video games based on real people
Video games developed in the United States
Video games set in the United States